Baldwin de Redvers, 6th Earl of Devon (1217 – 15 February 1245), feudal baron of Plympton in Devon and Lord of the Isle of Wight, was the son of Baldwin de Redvers and Margaret FitzGerold and grandson of William de Redvers, 5th Earl of Devon.

Career
Because his father died at a young age it is likely that Baldwin was born posthumously. Although it is not recorded when he came of age and did homage for his lands, it is known that he was knighted by King Henry III and created 6th Earl of Devon on Christmas Day 1239 at Winchester.

In 1240 he departed to the Holy Land on the Barons' Crusade with a host of crusaders led by Richard of Cornwall.

Family and children
In 1235 he married Amice de Clare (1220–1284), daughter of Gilbert de Clare, 4th Earl of Hertford and had the following children:

 Baldwin de Redvers, 7th Earl of Devon.
 Isabella de Redvers, Countess of Devon (or Isabella de Fortibus) (died 1293), married William de Forz, 4th Earl of Albemarle. After the death of her brother, she became Countess of Devon in her own right, and Lady of the Isle of Wight.

Footnotes

References

External links
 Redvers family
 England, Earls Created 1138–1143: Earls of Devon 1141–1262 (Redvers/Reviers)

1217 births
1245 deaths
6
Baldwin
Christians of the Barons' Crusade